is a Japanese TV drama series  that was aired on Fuji TV. The series started on April 16, 2007 and ended with 11 episodes on June 24, 2007. A special (SP) aired on  March 25, 2008.

A Korean remake of the series, Operation Proposal, starring Yoo Seung-ho and Park Eun-bin, aired in 2012.  A Chinese remake of the same title, Operation Love starring EXO's Lay and Chen Duling, aired in 2017.

Plot

Overview 
Ken Iwase (岩瀬健) is at his friend, Rei Yoshida's (吉田礼) marriage ceremony. However, he still loves her and regrets not having confessed his feelings towards her. A fairy lets him travel back in time and try one more time to get Rei's heart.

Episode synopsis 
In each episode, Ken travels to each photo that will appear in the slideshow that Mikio made, so that he can correct his regrets in each photo.

SP Synopsis 
A year later, the characters are in Hawaii for Hisashi's and Eri's wedding ceremony. The fairy appears and allows Ken to travel back in time to save the couple's relationship.

Characters

Main character 

The lead protagonist of this drama. Ken's biggest regret is never being able to confess his feelings to his Rei. Rei calls him Ken-Zou as a term of endearment. He was on the baseball team in high school and is currently a salesperson for electronic whiteboards. During Rei's wedding, he is given the chance to relive key moments of his life by entering into different photos in one of the presentations. He is extremely kind-hearted, even helping Tetsuya Tada knowing that in the future, Tada will be his main rival for Rei's affection.

Rei has been a childhood friend of Ken's. Their initial meeting is when Ken breaks his eraser in half and shares it with Rei. She has secretly loved Ken as well, but has never been able to articulate her feelings for him. Her seat in high school was always next to Ken's. In university, she studied architecture and won a major architectural award during the course of her studies. At the end of the series, she realizes that she never took the risk of telling Ken her feelings and runs out of her wedding to chase after him.

Other characters 

Eri has always been the person of Hisashi's affection. She finally decides to go out with him after he stops her from returning to an ex-boyfriend. She is also the best friend of Rei since high school.

Mikio begins to figure out that Ken is "slipping through time" and decides to assist him in his quest to change the future. He is also Ken's best friend because he is the only one who knows Ken's feelings towards Rei.

One of Ken's friends. He has always had a crush on Eri even after initial rejections.

Originally a student teacher at Ken's high school, Tada becomes friends with Ken's group and eventually marries Rei, but after the fairy miracle from which Ken's and Rei's relationship is born, he is seen teaching at a university and is on good terms with his childhood friend.

Cast 
 Tomohisa Yamashita as Ken Iwase
 Kaito Kitamura as Ken Iwase (primary school)
 Masami Nagasawa as Rei Yoshida
 Tamaki Matsumoto as Rei Yoshida (primary school)
 Kurumi Hashimoto as Rei Yoshida (childhood)
 Nana Eikura as Eri Oku
 Yūta Hiraoka as Enokido Mikio
 Gaku Hamada as Hisashi Tsurumi
 Naohito Fujiki as Tetsuya Tada
 Hiroshi Mikami as the Yosei/Fairy
 Yutaka Matsushige as Matsunori Itou
 Shigenori Yamazaki as 御法川潤蔵 (The master of ceremonies in the wedding)
 Leo Morimoto as Takashirei Yoshida
 Yoshiko Miyazaki as Reina Yoshida
 Gota Watabe as Socrates
 Fumina Hara as Yuko Matsuki (Mikio's girlfriend)
 Kenichiro Kikuchi as Tamotsu Nishio
 Issa Troare as the marathon runner
 Tomoya Takeuchi as classmate
 Masahiro Okawa as classmate
 Kenta Arai as classmate
 Ayaka Ikezawa as classmate
 Yuko Masumoto as classmate

Soundtrack
01 - Rising Road ~Main Theme~
02 - Honey Cheese
03 - Yume Oi Runner
04 - Rainy Man
05 - Sasayakana Negai
06 - Hallelujah Flash
07 - Samayou Kokoro
08 - Soremo Mata Seishun
09 - Sugar
10 - Kibou
11 - Gorioshi My Way
12 - Sepia no Kyoushitsu
13 - Ebi Fry
14 - DaDa double chance!
15 - Sunao na Kimochi
16 - Koi no Daisakusen
17 - Ame Agari
18 - Ashita Hareru Kana (Piano & Cordes)
19 - Kuwata Keisuke - Ashita Hareru Kana
20 - Mongol800 - Chiisana Koi No Uta

Awards 
53rd Television Drama Academy Awards 
 Best Drama
 Best Theme Song by Keisuke Kuwata.
 Special Award

11th Nikkan Sports Drama Grand Prix (Apr-June 7)
Best Drama
Best Actor - Yamashita Tomohisa
Best Actress - Nagasawa Masami
Best Supporting Actor - Hamada Gaku
Best Supporting Actress - Eikura Nana

References

External links 
 Fuji TV's Operation Love official site
ReviewAsia - Proposal Daisakusen Reviews

Japanese drama television series
Japanese romantic comedy television series
Fuji TV dramas
2007 Japanese television series debuts
2007 Japanese television series endings